BEC (Brandon Ebel Company) Recordings is a Christian rock record label that is an imprint of Tooth & Nail Records. The label was formed in 1997 in partnership with the EMI Christian Music Group.

The label promotes bands with more adult Christian rock sound than Tooth & Nail Records or Solid State Records, which concentrate on heavy metal, punk, and alternative rock. BEC's roster includes Jeremy Camp, KJ-52,  Kutless, and Hawk Nelson. Uprok Records, a former imprint of Tooth & Nail, lists its catalog under BEC.

Roster
Active

 All Things New
 Among the Thirsty
 Ashes Remain
 Adam Cappa
 Citizens & Saints
 David Dunn
 Ghost Ship
 Kings Kaleidoscope
 Dustin Kensrue
 Kutless
 Nine Lashes
 Andrew Marcus
 Diane Michelle
 Rapture Ruckus
 Shuree
 Jon Micah Sumrall
 7eventh Time Down
 Fearless BND                                                   
 Zauntee

Former
Includes artists on Uprok Recordings

* Aaron Gillespie (active, currently independent) 
 Ace Troubleshooter (disbanded, members now in Relient K and My Red Hot Nightmare)
 Adie (on hiatus)
 An Epic No Less (active, currently independent)
 Jessa Anderson (active, currently independent)
 Benjiman (active, currently on Save the City Records)
 BK & Associates (Status unknown)
 Bon Voyage (active, currently independent)
 Freddie Bruno (performing as part of Deepspace 5)
 Ray Buchanan (Status unknown)
 Cadet (disbanded)
 Jeremy Camp (active, currently on Sparrow Records)
 The Company (disbanded)
 The Cross Movement (disbanded, most members now performing solo)
 Deepspace5 (active, currently on Deepspace5 Records)
 The Dingees (active)
 The Echoing Green (active, currently on A Different Drum Records)
 Everman (disbanded)
 Falling Up (disbanded)
 Flight 180 (disbanded)
 Fold Zandura (on hiatus)
 The Glorious Unseen (active, currently independent)
 Grand Incredible (disbanded)
 Hangnail (disbanded)
 Hawk Nelson (active, currently on Fair Trade Services)
 iLL Harmonics (semi-active, currently independent)
 KJ-52 (active, currently on The Paradigm Collective)
 Joy Electric (on hiatus, currently on EEP Society, now performing as Said Fantasy)
 Jurny Big (active, currently performing without a label)
 The O.C. Supertones (disbanded) 
 Phillip LaRue (active, currently unsigned)
 Jadon Lavik (active, currently independent)
 Lost Dogs (active, currently on Fools of the World Records)
 LPG (performing as part of Tunnel Rats)
 Mainstay (on hiatus)
 Manafest (active, currently independent)
 Mars Ill (active, currently unsigned)
 Sarah Masen (active)
 MG! The Visionary (disbanded)
 Matty Mullins
 The Museum
 New Breed (status unknown)
 Bebo Norman (Retired from the music industry)
 Peace 586 (active)
 Peace of Mind (on indefinite hiatus)
 Pep Squad (disbanded)
 Pivitplex (active)
 Plankeye (disbanded; members went on to form Fielding and Fanmail)
 Project 86 (active, currently independent)
 Propaganda (active, currently on Humble Beast Records)
 Raphi (performs as part of Tunnel Rats)
 Jaymes Reunion (active, currently performing solo under Fugitive Recordings)
 .rod laver (disbanded)
 Seven Places (disbanded; members now in Kutless)
 Sev Statik (performs as part of Tunnel Rats)
 Seventh Day Slumber (active, currently with Rockfest Records)
 ShineBright (disbanded)
 Soul Purpose (disbanded, one time project featuring KJ-52 and producer Todd Collins)
 Smalltown Poets (on hiatus)
 Ryan Stevenson (active, signed to Gotee Records)
 Sup the Chemist (status unknown)
 Chris Taylor (active, independent)
 Telecast (disbanded)
 Tunnel Rats (on hiatus)
 Ultrabeat (status unknown)
 Underground Rise (disbanded)
 Value Pac (disbanded)
 Adam Watts (active, currently performing as the Adam Watts Band under Red Decibel Records)
 Josh White
 Sherri Youngward (active, currently unsigned)

 Happy Christmas
 Happy Christmas Vol. 2
 Happy Christmas Vol. 3
 Happy Christmas Vol. 4
 Happy Christmas Vol. 5

See also 
 List of Christian record labels

References

External links
 

 
American record labels
Christian record labels
Record labels established in 1997